Colón Department was one of the departments of Panama State, one of the states of Colombia.

Former departments of Colombia